Rupert James Hector Everett (born 29 May 1959) is an English actor, director and producer. Everett first came to public attention in 1981 when he was cast in Julian Mitchell's play and subsequent film Another Country (1984) as a gay pupil at an English public school in the 1930s; the role earned him his first BAFTA Award nomination. He received a second BAFTA nomination and his first Golden Globe Award nomination for his role in My Best Friend's Wedding (1997), followed by a second Golden Globe nomination for An Ideal Husband (1999).

Early life and education
Rupert James Hector Everett was born on 29 May 1959, to wealthy parents. His father was in the British Army, Major Anthony Michael Everett. His maternal grandfather, Vice Admiral Sir Hector Charles Donald MacLean DSO, was a nephew of Scottish recipient of the Victoria Cross, Hector Lachlan Stewart MacLean. His maternal grandmother, Opre Vyvyan, was a descendant of the baronets Vyvyan of Trelowarren and the German Freiherr (Baron) von Schmiedern. Everett is of English, Irish, Scottish, and more distant German and Dutch ancestry. He was raised a Roman Catholic.

From the age of seven, Everett was educated at Farleigh School in Andover, Hampshire, and later educated by Benedictine monks at Ampleforth College, Yorkshire. When he was sixteen, his parents agreed that he could leave school and move to London to train as an actor at the Royal Central School of Speech and Drama. He claims that in order to support himself during this time, he worked as a prostitute for drugs and money—he disclosed this information in an interview for US magazine in 1997.

Career

1980s
Everett's break came in 1981 at the Greenwich Theatre and later West End production of Another Country, playing a gay schoolboy opposite Kenneth Branagh.

His first film was the Academy Award-winning short A Shocking Accident (1982), directed by James Scott and based on a Graham Greene story. This was followed by a film version of Another Country in 1984 with Cary Elwes and Colin Firth. Following on with Dance With a Stranger (1985), Everett began to develop a promising film career until he co-starred with Bob Dylan in the huge flop Hearts of Fire (1987). Around the same time, Everett recorded and released an album of pop songs entitled Generation of Loneliness.

Despite being managed by Simon Napier-Bell (who had steered Wham! to prominence), the public didn't take to his change in direction. The shift was short-lived, and he only returned to pop indirectly by providing backing vocals for Madonna many years later, on her cover of "American Pie" and on the track "They Can't Take That Away from Me" on Robbie Williams' Swing When You're Winning in 2001.

1990s

In 1989, Everett moved to Paris, writing a novel, Hello, Darling, Are You Working?, and coming out as gay, a disclosure which he has said may well have damaged his career. Returning to the public eye in The Comfort of Strangers (1990), several films of variable success followed. The Italian comics character Dylan Dog, created by Tiziano Sclavi in 1986, is graphically inspired by him. Everett, in turn, appeared in Cemetery Man (1994), an adaptation of Sclavi's novel Dellamorte Dellamore. In 1995 Everett published a second novel, The Hairdressers of St. Tropez.

His career was revitalised by his award-winning performance in My Best Friend's Wedding (1997), playing Julia Roberts's character's gay friend, followed by a role as Madonna's character's best friend in The Next Best Thing (2000). (Everett was a backup vocalist on her cover of "American Pie", which is on the film's soundtrack.) Around the same time, he starred as the sadistic Sanford Scolex/Dr. Claw in Disney's Inspector Gadget (also 1999) with Matthew Broderick.

2000s

For the 21st century, Everett decided to write again. He has been a Vanity Fair contributing editor, written for The Guardian, and he wrote a film screenplay on playwright Oscar Wilde's final years, for which he sought funding.

In 2006, Everett published a memoir, Red Carpets and Other Banana Skins, in which he reveals his six-year affair with British television presenter Paula Yates. Although he is sometimes described as bisexual, as opposed to gay, during a radio show with Jonathan Ross, he described his heterosexual affairs as the result of adventurousness: "I was basically adventurous, I think I wanted to try everything".

Since the revelation of his sexuality, Everett has participated in public activities (leading the 2007 Sydney Gay and Lesbian Mardi Gras), played a double role in the film St. Trinian's, and has appeared on TV several times (as a contestant in the special Comic Relief Does The Apprentice; as a presenter for Live Earth; and as a guest host on the Channel 4 show The Friday Night Project, among others). He has also garnered media attention for his vitriolic quips and forthright opinions during interviews that have caused public outrage.

In May 2007, he delivered one of the eulogies at the funeral of fashion director Isabella Blow, his friend since they were teenagers, who had died by suicide. He asked as part of his speech: "Have you gotten what you wanted, Issie? Life was a relationship that you rejected." During this time he also voiced the nefarious, but handsome villain Prince Charming in the first two Shrek sequels.

Everett's documentary on Sir Richard Francis Burton (1821–1890) in which he retraces the travels of Burton through countries such as India and Egypt, aired on the BBC in 2008. In the documentary The Victorian Sex Explorer, Everett explores the life of a man who investigated a male brothel frequented by British soldiers in Bombay in disguise; who introduced The Koran, One Thousand And One Nights and the Kama Sutra in their first English translations; who travelled to the city of Mecca, and kissed the Holy Stone of Kaaba in disguise as an Arab; and was able to converse in more than 20 languages. Everett explained in 2008: "I've been interested in him for years. So many contradictions. Such a riveting, show business character. The godfather of the sexual revolution."

In 2009, Everett told British newspaper The Observer that he wished he had never revealed his sexuality, as he feels that it hurt his career and advised younger actors against such candour:

Also in 2009, Everett presented two Channel 4 documentaries: one on the travels of Lord Byron, the Romantic poet, broadcast in July 2009, and another on British explorer Sir Richard Burton.

Everett then returned to his acting roots, appearing in several theatre productions: his Broadway debut in 2009 at the Shubert Theatre received positive critical reviews; he performed in a Noël Coward play Blithe Spirit, starring alongside Angela Lansbury, Christine Ebersole and Jayne Atkinson, under the direction of Michael Blakemore. and he was expected to tour several Italian cities during the 2008–09 winter season in another Coward play Private Lives (performed in Italian, which he speaks fluently)—playing Elyot to Italian actress Asia Argento's Amanda—but the production was cancelled.

2010s

During the summer of 2010, Everett performed as Professor Henry Higgins, with English actress Honeysuckle Weeks and Stephanie Cole, in a revival of Pygmalion at the Chichester Festival Theatre. He reprised the role in May 2011 at the Garrick Theatre in London's West End, starring alongside Diana Rigg and Kara Tointon.

In July 2010, Everett was featured in the  family history programme Who Do You Think You Are? Released in late 2010, the comedy film Wild Target features Everett as an art-loving gangster, and also starred Bill Nighy and Emily Blunt.

In 2012, Everett starred in the television adaptation of Parade's End with Benedict Cumberbatch. The five-part drama was adapted by Sir Tom Stoppard from the novels of Ford Madox Ford, and Everett appears as the brother of protagonist Christopher Tietjens.

Everett then starred as Oscar Wilde in The Judas Kiss, a stage play which was revived at London's Hampstead Theatre beginning 6 September 2012, co-starring Freddie Fox as Bosie, and directed by Neil Armfield. It ran at the Hampstead through 13 October 2012, toured the UK and Dublin, then transferred to the West End at the Duke of York's Theatre on 9 January 2013 in a limited run through 6 April 2013.

Everett won the WhatsOnStage Award for Best Actor in a Play, and was nominated for the Olivier Award for Best Actor. In 2016 the production, still starring Everett and with Charlie Rowe as Bosie, ran in North America for seven weeks in Toronto and five weeks at BAM in New York City.

In early 2013, Everett began working on a film portraying the final period of Wilde's life, stating in the media that he has had a fascination with the playwright since he was a child, as his mother read him Wilde's children's story The Happy Prince before he slept. Everett explained in November 2013:
The book made me feel mystical at a very early age, there's a line in it which I didn't really understand and I still don't when the happy prince says to the swallow, "there is no mystery as great as suffering", I certainly didn't understand what it meant and I'm sure my mother reading it to me hadn't got a clue what it meant, but that was interesting and mysterious and a deep thought.

The subsequent film The Happy Prince, written and directed by Everett, was released in 2018.

In 2015, it was announced that he would play the part of Philippe Achille, Marquis de Feron, the corrupt Governor of Paris, Head of the Red Guard and illegitimate brother to Louis XIII in the third series of the BBC One drama The Musketeers.

In 2017, Everett appeared as a recurring character in the BBC 2 comedy Quacks. He plays Dr Hendricks, the neurotic principal of the medical school.

Personal life
Between 2006 and 2010, Everett lived in New York City, but returned to London because of his father's poor health. In 2008, he purchased a home in the Central London district of Belgravia.

, Everett lives with his partner Henrique, a Brazilian accountant.

In the 1990s, Everett had a six-year long affair with television presenter and writer Paula Yates, who was married to Bob Geldof at the time. In an interview with Piers Morgan for Life Stories with Piers Morgan, Everett stated: "We were very, very close, I must say, for a long time, and she’s someone that I adored and still do. I think I was in love with her."

Political views
Everett is a patron of the British Monarchists Society and Foundation.

In 2006, as a homeowner in the central London area of Bloomsbury, Everett supported a campaign to prevent the establishment of a local Starbucks branch and referred to the global chain as a "cancer". Everett protested alongside 1,000 other residents and the group compiled a signed petition.

In 2013, Everett worked on the production of a documentary on sex work for Channel 4 that includes the issue of criminalisation. During and after the filming of the documentary, Everett contributed to the discourse on prostitution legislation in the UK. In October 2013, he signed an open letter by the English Collective of Prostitutes and Queer Strike—alongside groups such as the Association of Trade Union Councils, Sex Worker Open University, Left Front Art – Radical Progressive Queers, Queer Resistance, and Queers Against the Cuts—to oppose the adoption of the "Swedish model", whereby the clients of sex workers (though not the sex workers themselves) are criminalised.

Everett continued his participation in the sex work legislation debate in 2014, writing a long-form piece for The Guardian and appearing on the BBC One programme This Week. His January Guardian article was published in the wake of human trafficking raids in the Soho area of London, where he wrote:

There is a land grab going on in Soho under the banner of morality. That night ... 200 of our boys in blue raided more than 20 models' flats, arresting 30 girls and confiscating their earnings ... They broke down doors, intimidated girls into accepting cautions (i.e. criminal records) and served civil-eviction papers that, unless you were a lawyer, you would not know had hidden in their depths (20-odd pages) the time and date you were to appear in court if you wanted to appeal. All this in the name of human trafficking ... But while even the police say that more than 90% of prostitutes work of their own accord, trafficking has become one of the new "it" words in the bankrupt moral vernacular, craftily used by puritans, property developers and rogue feminists to combat the sex trade in general. Sections 52 and 53 of the Sexual Offences Act ... shelter under the anti-trafficking umbrella. These laws are created to protect women. In reality, they are putting working girls on to the street and into great danger.

Everett also joined protesters in a demonstration outside the offices of Soho Estates, a major property company that owns properties on Soho's Walkers Court, where many sex workers are based. Everett informs the reader that Soho Estates received approval to demolish properties on Walkers Court to create space for the construction of "two hideous towers replete with heliports". Everett concludes the article by declaring that Soho is "being reduced to a giant waxwork in a museum, nothing more than the set for a foreign film."

In his appearance on BBC One's This Week, Everett engaged in a debate with regular panellists Michael Portillo and Diane Abbott. Portillo agreed with Everett, while Abbott supported the Swedish model.

Despite being an openly gay man, Everett does not consider himself part of the gay community and has been an outspoken critic of the introduction of same-sex marriage, stating: "I loathe heterosexual weddings. The wedding cake, the party, the champagne, the inevitable divorce two years later. It's just a waste of time in the heterosexual world, and in the homosexual world I find it personally beyond tragic that we want to ape this institution that is so clearly a disaster." Everett has also disclosed that he identified as transgender during his childhood and dressed as a girl from the age of six to fourteen. When he turned fifteen, he ceased to identify as female and embraced his identity as a gay man. He has expressed opposition to the use of hormones on children, citing that parents who offer the possibility of such a transition to their children are "scary".

He was a supporter of a People's Vote on the final Brexit deal.

Everett expressed his opposition to cancel culture in a 2020 interview with The Advocate, stating  “we’re in such a weird new world, a kind of Stasi it feels like to me, and if you don’t reflect exactly the right attitude, you risk everything just being destroyed for you by this judgmental, sanctimonious, intransigent, intractable, invisible cauldron of hags around in the virtual world.”

Filmography

Film

Television

Theatre

Awards and nominations

Bibliography
 1992: Hello, Darling, Are You Working? (novel)
 1995: The Hairdressers of St. Tropez (novel)
 2006: Red Carpets and Other Banana Skins (memoir)
 2012: Vanished Years (memoir)
 2019: To the End of the World: Travels with Oscar Wilde

References

Further reading
 Martin Poll Papers 1967–1984 (40.0 linear feet) are housed at the New York University Libraries. Includes materials on Rupert Everett.

External links

 
 
 

1959 births
Living people
20th-century English biographers
20th-century English novelists
20th-century English male actors
21st-century English biographers
21st-century English novelists
21st-century English male actors
21st-century English memoirists
20th-century English LGBT people
21st-century English LGBT people
Actors from Norfolk
Alumni of the Royal Central School of Speech and Drama
British expatriate male actors in the United States
British male novelists
British monarchists
English expatriates in the United States
English film producers
English male film actors
English male Shakespearean actors
English male stage actors
English male television actors
English male voice actors
English people of Scottish descent
English gay actors
British gay writers
English LGBT writers
English LGBT novelists
Male actors from London
People associated with Glasgow
People educated at Ampleforth College
People from Belgravia
People from Brancaster
Writers from London